Jack Howell may refer to:

 Jack Howell (baseball) (born 1961), former Major League Baseball third baseman
 Jack Howell (footballer) (1924–1994), Australian rules footballer
 Jack Howell (physician) (1926–2015), British physician
 Jack Howell (swimmer) (1899–1967), American Olympic swimmer
 Jack P. Howell (1895–1971), Australian rules footballer

See also
John Howell (disambiguation)